"Italian Military Internees" (Italienische Militärinternierte in German, Internati Militari Italiani in Italian, abbreviated as IMI) was the official name given by Germany to the Italian soldiers captured, rounded up and deported in the territories of Nazi Germany in Operation Achse in the days immediately following the World War II armistice between Italy and Allied armed forces (September 8, 1943).

After disarmament by the Germans, the Italian soldiers and officers were confronted with the choice to continue fighting as allies of the German army (either in the armed forces of the Italian Social Republic, the German puppet regime in northern Italy led by Mussolini, or in Italian "volunteer" units in the German armed forces) or, otherwise, be sent to detention camps in Germany. Those soldiers and officials which refused to recognize the "republic" led by Mussolini were taken as civilian prisoners too. Only 10 percent agreed to enroll. The others were considered prisoners of war. Later they were re-designated "military internees" by the Germans (so as to not recognize the rights granted prisoners of war by the Third Geneva Convention), and finally, in the autumn of 1944 until the end of the war, "civilian workers", so they could be subjected to hard labor without protection of the Red Cross.

The Nazis considered the Italians as traitors and not as prisoners of war. The former Italian soldiers were sent into forced labor in war industries (35.6%), heavy industry (7.1%), mining (28.5%), construction (5.9%) and agriculture (14.3%). The working conditions were very poor. The Italians were inadequately fed or clothed for the German winter. Many became sick and died.

Numbers of prisoners and casualties 

The Germans disarmed and captured 1,007,000 Italian soldiers, out of a total of approximately 2,000,000 actually in the army. Of these, 196,000 fled during the deportation. Of the remaining approximately 810,000 (of which 58,000 were caught in France, 321,000 in Italy and 430,000 in the Balkans), more than 13,000 lost their lives during the transportation from the Greek islands to the mainland and 94,000, including almost all the Blackshirts of the MVSN, decided immediately to accept the offer to fight alongside the Germans. This left a total of approximately 710,000 Italian soldiers deported into German prison camps with the status of IMI. By the spring of 1944, some 103,000 had declared themselves ready to serve in Germany or the Italian Social Republic, as combatants or as auxiliary workers. In total, therefore, between 600,000 and 650,000 soldiers refused to continue the war alongside the Germans.

The estimates of losses among the IMI vary between 37,000 and 50,000. The causes of death were:

 the harshness and danger of forced labor (10,000 dead)
 disease and malnutrition, especially in the last months of the war (23,000)
 executions inside the camps (4,600)
 the allied bombings of facilities where they worked (2,700)
 others perished on the Eastern Front (5,000-7,000)

At the end of the war, several thousand former IMI ended up in the hands of French, Soviets or  Yugoslavs, and instead of being released, were kept in captivity for some time after the end of the war.

Ships sunk carrying Italian POWs 

 Gaetano Donizetti, Sep. 23 1943, Rhodes, 1,796 killed, sunk by HMS Eclipse
 Ardena, Sep. 27 1943, Argostoli, 779 killed, sunk by a mine 
 Mario Roselli, Oct. 11 1943, Corfu, 1,302 killed, sunk by RAF air attack
 Maria Amalia, Oct. 13 1943, Kefalonia, 544 killed, sunk by a mine or by a Royal Navy submarine (either HMS Unruly or HMS Trooper)
 Sinfra, Oct. 20 1943, Crete, 2,098 killed, sunk by RAF and USAAF air attacks
 Aghios Antonios - Kal 89, Nov. 19th 1943, Karpathos, 110 killed, sunk by ORP Sokół
 Leda, Feb. 2nd 1944, Amorgos, 780 killed, sunk by RAF air attack
 Petrella, Feb. 8 1944, Souda, 2,670 killed, sunk by HMS Sportsman
 Oria, Feb. 12 1944, Cape Sounion, 4,074 killed, shipwrecked in a storm
 Sifnos, March 4, 1944, Milos, 70 killed, sunk by RAF air attack 
 Tanais, June 9, 1944, Crete, 213 killed, sunk by HMS Vivid
Total of 13,939 killed

Some well-known IMIs 

 Giovannino Guareschi
 Tonino Guerra
 Alessandro Natta
 Mario Rigoni Stern
 Gianrico Tedeschi
 Giuseppe Tontodonati

See also
Disarmed Enemy Forces
La Voce della Patria

References

External links
 Between Two Stools. The History of the Italian Military Internees 1943 - 1945 web site of the exhibition at the Nazi Forced Labour Documentation Centre in Berlin
 The Sand Mine - documentary web about the massacre of 127 Italian forced labourers in April 1945 in Treuenbrietzen (Brandenburg).

Military history of Italy during World War II
World War II prisoners of war
Nazi war crimes in Italy
Unfree labor during World War II
Economy of Nazi Germany
Italian prisoners of war

de:Militärinternierte#Italienische Militärinternierte